Mark Gerald Esser (born April 1, 1956) is a former professional baseball pitcher.

He was selected by the Baltimore Orioles in the 20th round of the 1975 MLB Draft out of Roy C. Ketcham High School in Wappinger, New York and again by the Chicago White Sox in the 8th round of the 1977 MLB Draft out of Miami Dade College.

He was assigned to the Gulf Coast League to begin his professional career.

Esser made his Major League debut on April 22, 1979 against the Cleveland Indians at Cleveland Stadium. He pitched 1.1 scoreless innings in relief of Francisco Barrios. Seven days later, he pitched in the second and final Major League game of his career. Esser faced four Texas Rangers batters at Comiskey Park and retired only one of them, allowing three earned runs on one hit and two walks.

On August 2, 1982, he and Bill Atkinson combined to throw a no-hitter for the Glens Falls White Sox. It would be his final season in professional baseball.

References

External links

Major League Baseball pitchers
Chicago White Sox players
Gulf Coast White Sox players
Appleton Foxes players
Iowa Oaks players
Glens Falls White Sox players
Miami Dade Sharks baseball players
Baseball players from Pennsylvania
Sportspeople from Erie, Pennsylvania
1956 births
Living people
Roy C. Ketcham High School alumni